The BYD G5 is a compact sedan that was produced by the Chinese automaker BYD.

Overview
The BYD G5 debuted at the April 2014 Beijing Auto Show and was launched in September 2014. Price ranges from 75.900 yuan to 102.900 yuan. Based on a stretched platform of the BYD F3, the BYD G5 is positioned slightly above the compact BYD F3 and below the mid-size BYD G6.

References

G5
Mid-size cars
Front-wheel-drive vehicles
Cars of China

Cars introduced in 2014